Aisin Gioro Hongyan (弘曕; 9 May 1733 – 27 April 1765), formally known as Prince Guo, was an imperial prince of the Manchu ruled Qing Dynasty. He was the sixth son of Yongzheng Emperor.

Life 
Hongyan was born in the Manchu Aisin Gioro clan as the sixth son of the Yongzheng Emperor.His mother was Consort Qian (謙妃)  of the Liugiya clan (劉氏), daughter of Liu Man (刘满), an official in the Qing imperial court.

When Yongzheng died, Hongyan was just 6 years old and the responsibility of educating Hongyan was taken by Emperor Qianlong. Hongyang loved the Yuanming Yuan so much that his nickname was Yuanming Yuan Prince.

In February 1738, Hongyan was granted the title of Prince Guo of the First Rank (果恭郡王). Qianlong was fond of him and trusted him with many important affairs. In 1759, Hongyan served as a colonel (都統) in the Bordered White Banner and in 1761, as commandant in the Han Bordered Blue Banner.

On May 13 in the 28th year of Qianlong Emperor, Hongyan asked Gao Heng to sell ginseng due to debts to the salt merchant Jiang Qixi.When the emperor found, Hongyan was downgraded to Prince of the Third Rank and withdrew from the official posts.

In February  1765, Hongyan became sick with a serious illness and Qianlong Emperor granted the title of Prince of the Second Rank to him.

On  27 April 1765, Hongyan died and was posthumously honoured as Prince Guo Gong of the Second Rank (果恭郡王) and be buried with the rites of a prince of the first rank.Qianlong didn't personally attend his funeral but designed one of his sons to don the mourning grab.

Family 
Primary Consort

 Primary Consort, of the Fangiya clan (嫡福晉 范佳氏)
 Yongtu (果簡郡王 永瑹; 20 July 1752 – 10 September 1789), Prince Guojian of the Second Rank, first son
 Yongcan (镇国将军 永璨; 9 September 1753 – 2 January 1811), Hereditary General of the First Rank, second son

Secondary Consort

 Secondary Consort, of the Janggiya clan (側福晉 張佳氏)

Concubine

 Mistress, of the Liugiya clan (庶福晉 劉佳氏)
 Yongna (7 December 1762 – 1 December 1767), third son

Ancestry

See also 

 Royal and noble ranks of the Qing dynasty
 Ranks of imperial consorts in China#Qing
 Prince Guo (果王)

In fiction and popular culture 

 Portrayed by Duan Shaonan in Empresses in the Palace (2011)

References 

1733 births
1765 deaths
Yongzheng Emperor's sons